Nolina erumpens, the foothill beargrass, mesa sacahuista, or sand beargrass, is a member of the subfamily Nolinaceae of family Asparagaceae, native to New Mexico, Texas and adjacent regions of north Mexico.

Description
The 2-2.6 feet long, 0.8 inch wide longitudinally grooved leaves of N. erumpens grow in wide tufts, and are sharp and serrated on the margins with loose-hanging filament-like appendages. The inflorescences are club shaped and rarely grow longer than the leaves, and bear numerous tiny, cream-colored flowers. The plant flowers in the late spring and early summer and the flowers attract ants, wasps and bees. Fruit is capsule-shaped and thin-walled.

Cultivation
Nolina erumpens is extremely rare in amateur private collections but may be found in some botanical gardens among collections of succulent plants.

References

erumpens
Flora of Chihuahua (state)
Flora of Texas
Flora of New Mexico
Plants described in 1858
Taxa named by John Torrey
Taxa named by Sereno Watson